The 1974–75 North American Hockey League season was the second season of the North American Hockey League. Eight teams participated in the regular season, and the Johnstown Jets were the league champions.

Regular season

Lockhart Cup-Playoffs

First round
Long Island Cougars - Philadelphia Firebirds 3:1 on series (2:4, 3:2, 5:2, 8:2)
Broome County Dusters - Mohawk Valley Comets 3:1 on series (5:2, 3:5, 7:3, 2:1)
Johnstown Jets - Cape Codders 3:1 on series (3:0, 4:6, 6:3, 4:2)

Semifinals
Johnstown Jets - Syracuse Blazers 4:3 on series (3:4, 3:2, 5:3, 0:4, 4:6, 6:3, 5:4)
Broome County Dusters - Long Island Cougars 4:3 on series (1:2 OT, 2:1, 4:6, 3:4, 3:1, 4:3 OT, 7:5)

Final
Johnstown Jets - Broome County Dusters 4:0 on series (5:1, 7:4, 2:1, 6:2)

External links
 Statistics on hockeydb.com

North American Hockey League (1973–1977) seasons
NAHL